International School Dhaka (ISD) is an International Baccalaureate (IB) World School in Dhaka, Bangladesh that was established in 1999. The school enrolls students in the age range of 2–18, from Playgroup through to Grade 12, providing an international education for local and expatriate children living in Bangladesh. There are over 70 international teachers or administrators from about 20 different nationalities. The school is recognized by the Bangladesh Ministry of Education and is accredited by the Council of International Schools, the New England Association of Schools and Colleges and authorized by the International Baccalaureate Organization.

History
ISD is part of STS Educational Group Limited.

In 1998, the STS Group decided to diversify into the supply of educational and medical services and consequently set up subsidiaries. It acquired land in Bashundhara Residential Area; a site in the northeast quadrant of the city. The International School Dhaka (ISD) was granted NEASC accreditation on 4 November 2004 and CIS accreditation on 25 November 2004.

Curriculum
The curriculum comprises the Early Years and the International Baccalaureate Primary Years Programme (PYP), Middle Years Programme (MYP) and the Diploma Programme. The average class size in Playgroup to Kindergarten is 13 students, in Primary School is 16, and in Secondary School is 18.

Authorized to offer the IB Diploma Programme since May 2005, the programme is taught in English. Students at this school usually take IB exams in May.

Academic achievements
In the year 2007, ISD ranked number one in the Bangladesh Debate Council (BDC)'s 3rd BDC Pre Worlds Ranking.
The school is known as one of the best schools in Bangladesh.

Hillary Clinton's visit
On May 6, 2012, former US Secretary of State Hillary Clinton visited ISD and held a Q&A event at the school's  auditorium. The former Secretary of State of the United States of 
America shared her vision for Bangladesh's emergence as a strong developing economy and addressed the ISD Alumni and students in the audience as the future leaders of Bangladesh, with promises of opportunities coming their way. When asked how she overcame the obstacles as a woman to become one of the most influential women in the world today, she emphasized the importance of a good education and the support of her parents.

References

External links
 

International Baccalaureate schools in Bangladesh
International schools in Dhaka
Educational institutions established in 1999
1999 establishments in Bangladesh